Gregory Antone Prince (born 1948) is an American pathology researcher, businessman, author, social critic, and historian of the Latter Day Saint movement.

Biography
Prince was born and raised in Los Angeles, California.  After graduating as valedictorian from Dixie College (St. George, Utah), he served a two-year mission in Brazil for the Church of Jesus Christ of Latter-day Saints (LDS Church) at age 19.  Upon returning to the United States in 1969, Prince attended graduate school at the University of California, Los Angeles, receiving a D.D.S. (valedictorian) in 1973 and a Ph.D in pathology in 1975.  In 1975 he and his wife, JaLynn Rasmussen, moved to Washington D.C., for a post-doctoral fellowship at the National Institutes of Health.  After spending more than a decade at NIH and Johns Hopkins University, he co-founded Virion Systems, Inc. (VSI), a biotechnology company focused on the prevention and treatment of pediatric infectious diseases.  Building on discoveries that Prince made as a doctoral student, VSI pioneered the prevention of respiratory syncytial virus (RSV) disease in high-risk infants through the use of monoclonal antibody.  (RSV is the primary cause of infant pneumonia throughout the world.)  VSI's technologies were licensed to MedImmune, Inc., and the collaborative efforts of the two companies and other partners resulted in the approval by the U.S. Food and Drug Administration of Synagis, a drug that is currently given to approximately a quarter-million high-risk infants throughout the world each year.  In 2020, Prince became CEO of Soft Cell Biological Research, Inc. and its subsidiary company, Soft Cell Labs, Inc.  Both labs focus on the role of L-form bacteria (bacteria that shed their cell walls and thus become capable of evading the immune system) in chronic human diseases.

In 2008, Prince and his wife established the Madison House Autism Foundation, named after their youngest son who is autistic, for the purpose of addressing the perplexing issues facing adults with autism, along with those facing family members, caregivers and society at large.

Prince serves on the boards of several non-profit institutions including the National Advisory Council, Utah Tech University; the Dean's Advisory Council, University of Utah School of Dentistry; and the Board of Governors, Wesley Theological Seminary.

In the 2010s, Prince began to call for a better understanding, within the views common among Latter-day Saints, of certain causal relationships between biology and sexual orientation.

In recognition of his lifetime achievements, Prince was inducted into the Dixie State College Hall of Fame in 1999, and in 2012 was awarded an Honorary Doctorate of Humanities by the same institution.  In 2013 he was named Alumnus of the Year of the UCLA School of Dentistry, and in 2017 he was given the Distinguished Service Award by Utah State University.

Prince was one of several leading figures in Mormon studies interviewed for the PBS documentary The Mormons.  He lives with his family in Potomac, Maryland.

Publications
Prince is the author of over 150 scientific publications in the field of infectious diseases, the majority dealing with RSV. He has also published several articles on religious history and theology, as well as five books in the same field: Having Authority: The Origins and Development of Priesthood During the Ministry of Joseph Smith (1993); Power from On High: The Development of Mormon Priesthood (1995); David O. McKay and the Rise of Modern Mormonism (2005), co-authored with William Robert Wright; Leonard Arrington and the Writing of Mormon History (2016); and Gay Rights and the Mormon Church: Intended Actions, Unintended Consequences (2019).  The McKay book was the recipient of four prestigious awards, and the Arrington book received the Evans Biography Award.

Scientific journals 
The following is a partial list of published scientific articles in which Prince was a lead author:

Mormon studies 
The following is a list of Prince's books and articles relating to Mormonism.

 Coauthored with Wm. Robert Wright.

Notes

External links
 The Gregory A. Prince Papers at the J. Willard Marriott Library Special Collections, University of Utah
 
 Interview with Prince on the Mormon Stories podcast
 Article on Prince's wife winning the 1999 National Mother of Young Children by American Mothers Inc.
 Prince's biography from the Dixie Forum at Dixie State College
 Prince's March 2010 presentations at Utah State University about David O. McKay
 Prince's biography from Dixie State College's 1999 Science and Technology Hall of Fame

1948 births
20th-century Mormon missionaries
American Latter Day Saint writers
American Mormon missionaries in Brazil
American pathologists
American technology chief executives
Utah Tech University alumni
Historians of the Latter Day Saint movement
Johns Hopkins University people
Latter Day Saints from California
Latter Day Saints from Maryland
Living people
People from Potomac, Maryland
UCLA School of Dentistry alumni
Writers from Los Angeles